Loma Plata is a city in the district (distrito) of Department of Boquerón, Paraguay. It is located 407km from Asunción by a paved detour of 22km from the Ruta Transchaco. It is the main town of the Menno Colony, one of the Mennonite colonies of the Paraguayan Chaco.

Climate

The temperature in summer reaches up to 44°C and can reach 0°C in winter. The average temperature is 26°C. The rainy season is December through March.

History

After Russia introduced the general conscription in 1874, about a third of the Russian Mennonites migrated to the US and Canada, as Mennonite churches have a tradition of non-violence. The members of the Colonia Menno (of which Loma Plata is the current largest town and administrative centre), settled first in Canada until a universal, compulsory, secular education was implemented in 1917 that required the use of the English language. Conservative Mennonites saw this as a threat to the religious basis of their community. In 1927, 1,743 pioneers came from Canada to Paraguay and turned the arid Chaco into fertile farmland. It was the first Mennonite colony in the region. Some years later, more Mennonite immigrants arrived in the Chaco area from Germany and Russia and founded the Fernheim (1930) and Neuland (1947) colonies.

The Mennonites' arrival was not properly prepared for by the Casado complex; the land had not been surveyed, no railroad had been constructed in the settlement location, and settlement was delayed by 16 months during which the Mennonites stayed in Puerto Casado.

With no railway, the settlers travelled with oxen carts through underdeveloped roads. The gradual move to the settlement area started in April 1928. Initially some families lived in wilderness camps, while many still lived in Puerto Casado. Many became sick due to the lack of medical care, whereof 121 died, 75 of them being children under 14 years. Some 60 families returned to Canada. Eventually they formed 14 villages. Over time, infrastructure was built alongside houses such as schools and churches. Today, the Menno Colony has about 9,000 descendants of the approximately 1,200 settlers, and a multicultural demographic including Mennonites, indigenous Paraguayans, Latin Paraguayans, and other smaller groups.

In 1937, Loma Plata emerged as the colony center and a colony office was built (currently the Post office). Loma Plata is a Spanish name. Some settlers rejected it and petitioned for a German name. Loma Plata was unofficially renamed "Sommerfeld" but reverted to its publicly recognized name of Loma Plata within a dozen years.

Today, Loma Plata is the main town of the colony and home to an agricultural co-operative, La Cooperativa Chortitzer Ltda., which focuses on dairy and meat production.

Church
The first and biggest church building was built in Osterwick outside Loma Plata. Today there are several German speaking Mennonite churches as well as Spanish speaking churches. Some German speaking Churches are Emmanuelgemeinde, Elimgemeinde, Mennonitengemeinde, Bethelgemeinde, Hoffnung für Alle and Manoagemeinde. Agua Viva is a Mennonite Spanish speaking church. There are also Spanish/Portuguese speaking Pentecostal churches.

Economy

Residents of Loma Plata are engaged in agriculture, livestock and industry. They are organized in La Cooperativa Chortitzer Ltda. There are large dairies in the region, with about 5,000 persons living in Loma Plata. There are two large supermarkets and several smaller supermarkets and corner shops as well as hardware stores in Loma Plata. There is also a bookshop with German, English and Spanish books. There are many small clothes shops all over Loma Plata.

Health
Loma Plata contains one of the 4 hospitals in the department of Boquerón. It was constructed in 1948. The work and costs were largely covered voluntarily and with donations. The first building had a size of 17x50 feet with a consultation room, a laboratory, a pharmacy and three rooms for patients.

Today, the hospital in Loma Plata is a modern health facility and is part of the services provided by the Asociacion Civil Chortitzer Komitee. It does not provide services exclusively to Mennonite colony members. Outward specialists come to the colony on scheduled times throughout the year in order to provide services including child birth.

There is a health clinic at the hospital as well as a private health clinic in Loma Plata. Loma Plata has a nursing school where students can obtain a degree as a licensed nurse in cooperation with Universidad Evangelica de Paraguay.

There are also several private medical clinics in the town, some with doctors that work privately as well as in the hospital. There are dental clinics in as well. The pharmacies are all private, except the pharmacy at the hospital, which belongs to the Asociacion Civil Chortitzer Komitee.

Tourism
The tourist office is situated in a traditional building on the main street, north of the cooperative's supermarket. The tourist office screens a film on the founding of the colony daily.

Loma Plata has a museum with an outdoor exhibit of early farming equipment, a typical pioneer house, and a photographic exhibit on the colony's history. Guided tours are given in German, Plattdeutsch, Spanish and English.

The dairy production company "Trebol" also offers guided tours of their facilities.

Tours are available to the meat works, Frigochorti. The slaughtering process can be viewed through glass windows as it happens.

The Rodeo Club Isla Po'i, which belongs to the breeders' association in Colonia Menno, annually exhibits on June 12. The exhibit includes developments in agriculture and farming equipment, amongst other sponsors.

Transportation
Loma Plata is accessible via a paved road 22 km long, branching off the Transchaco highway. Nasa and Golondrina provide bus services multiple times a day between Loma Plata and Asuncion. Loma Plata also has a private airport.

References

 Geography Illustrated Paraguay, Distributed Arami SRL, 2007. 
 Geography of Paraguay, First Edition 1999, Publisher Hispanic Paraguay SRL.

External links
 Loma Plata (Menno Colony, Boquerón Department, Paraguay) at Global Anabaptist Mennonite Encyclopedia Online
 National Secretary of Tourism
 Paraguayan National Mail

Populated places in the Boquerón Department
Mennonitism in Paraguay
Populated places established in 1926
Russian Mennonite diaspora in South America